Dale Curtis Sveum (born November 23, 1963) is an American former Major League Baseball (MLB) player and manager. He most recently served as the bench coach for the Kansas City Royals. As a player, Sveum saw action in 12 major league seasons between 1986 and 1999. He was a member of the Milwaukee Brewers, Philadelphia Phillies, Chicago White Sox, Oakland Athletics, Seattle Mariners, Pittsburgh Pirates, and New York Yankees. Following his playing career, Sveum managed in minor league baseball for several seasons before becoming an MLB coach. Sveum briefly served as manager of the Brewers in 2008 during his tenure as hitting coach for the team. He was later named manager of the Cubs after the 2011 season and served for two seasons. His cousin is former Blue Jays All-Star John Olerud.

Playing career
During his time at Pinole Valley High School, Sveum was recognized as an All-State and All-American quarterback, in addition to playing baseball and basketball. Drafted by the Milwaukee Brewers in the first round (25th pick) of the 1982 amateur draft, he went on to play 12 seasons in MLB, hitting .236 with 69 home runs.

One of his personal highlights came early in the season, when he hit a walk-off home run at County Stadium to give Milwaukee a 6–4 victory over the Texas Rangers. This victory, which came on April 19 (Easter Sunday), led the Brewers to a 12–0 record on the season.

On July 17, 1987, Sveum totaled three homers and six RBIs during a 12–2 thumping of the California Angels.

On September 3, 1988, Sveum was involved in a severe collision with fellow Brewer Darryl Hamilton. He also sat out the entire  MLB season, while seeing action in 17 games in the minor leagues.

In his first three major league seasons, Sveum's lowest yearly batting average was .242. Following his return to the majors in 1990, he only batted over .241 twice in parts of nine seasons.

During his career, Sveum had the distinction of playing for five separate managers who would
(at some point in their careers) win a league Manager of the Year Award:

Tony La Russa (1983, 1988, 1992, 2002), in Oakland
Jim Leyland (1990, 1992, 2006), in Pittsburgh
Gene Lamont (1993), with the Chicago White Sox
Lou Piniella (1995, 2001, 2008), in Seattle
Joe Torre (1996, 1998), in New York

Coaching career

Pittsburgh

Prior to coaching in Milwaukee, Sveum managed the Double A team in the Pittsburgh Pirates organization from 2001–2003, compiling a 213–211 record. In 2003, Baseball America tabbed Sveum as the best potential MLB manager in the Eastern League.

Boston Red Sox
Sveum was on the coaching staff of the Boston Red Sox from 2004–05, serving as third base coach and working under manager (and former Brewers teammate) Terry Francona. Following Sveum's second season in Boston, he left the Red Sox to rejoin Milwaukee as the team's bench coach.

Milwaukee Brewers
On October 30, 2007, Sveum switched positions on the staff and became the team's third base coach.

On September 15, 2008, he was named interim manager of the Milwaukee Brewers after manager Ned Yost was fired. Sveum led the team to a 7–5 record to close out the 2008 regular season, which was enough for the Brewers to make the playoffs for the first time since their World Series run in 1982. Under Sveum's leadership, the Brewers lost the 2008 NLDS to the Philadelphia Phillies in 4 games.

As Ken Macha took over the Brewers for the 2009 season, Sveum stayed on as the team's hitting coach.

Chicago Cubs
On November 16, 2011 the Chicago Cubs offered Sveum their vacant managerial position. The following day, on November 17, 2011, he accepted an offer to become the new manager of the Chicago Cubs, and was introduced on November 18, 2011. Sveum was fired on September 30, 2013 after posting a record of 127-197 in two seasons with the Cubs. On August 16, 2017, Sveum received a World Series ring from the team.

Kansas City Royals
On October 3, 2013, the Kansas City Royals announced they had hired Sveum as a coach and infield instructor, reuniting him with Yost (serving as manager).

On May 29, 2014, the Royals promoted Sveum to hitting coach in an effort to improve a lackluster offensive start to the season.

Sveum departed the Royals when Yost retired from the team after the 2019 season.

Managerial record

References

External links

Dale Sveum at SABR (Baseball BioProject)

1963 births
Living people
Altoona Curve managers
American expatriate baseball players in Canada
Baseball coaches from California
Baseball players from California
Beloit Brewers players
Boston Red Sox coaches
Calgary Cannons players
Chicago Cubs managers
Chicago White Sox players
Denver Zephyrs players
El Paso Diablos players
Kansas City Royals coaches
Major League Baseball bench coaches
Major League Baseball hitting coaches
Major League Baseball shortstops
Major League Baseball third basemen
Major League Baseball third base coaches
Milwaukee Brewers coaches
Milwaukee Brewers players
Milwaukee Brewers managers
Nashville Sounds players
New York Yankees players
Oakland Athletics players
Philadelphia Phillies players
Pikeville Brewers players
Pittsburgh Pirates players
Seattle Mariners players
Stockton Ports players
Tacoma Tigers players
Tucson Sidewinders players
Vancouver Canadians players